Bryan Lewis Cathcart (November 4, 1896 – September 18, 1979) was a Canadian politician who was a Member of Provincial Parliament in Legislative Assembly of Ontario from 1945 to 1963. He represented the riding of Lambton West for the Ontario Progressive Conservative Party. Born in Spokane, Washington, he was a merchant. He died at a Sarnia hospital in 1979.

References

External links

1896 births
1979 deaths
Progressive Conservative Party of Ontario MPPs